Eileen Erskine (15 August 1914 – 8 November 1995) was an English actress from Nottingham who was active in film mainly in the 1940s when she appeared in This Happy Breed (1944) and Great Expectations (1946). Her theatre work included the original West End production of J. B. Priestley's Time and the Conways in 1937; and on Broadway she was in Faithfully Yours, in 1951. Her television appearances included BBC TV's The Pallisers in 1974 Her autobiography, Scenes from a Life, was published posthumously.

Filmography

References

External links

1914 births
1995 deaths
English stage actresses
English film actresses
English television actresses
Actors from Nottingham
20th-century English actresses